Psyllopsis is a genus of jumping plant lice, also known as psyllids.

Species

 Psyllopsis discrepans (Flor, 1861)
 Psyllopsis distinguenda Edwards, 1913
 Psyllopsis dobreanuae Loginova, 1971
 Psyllopsis fraxini (Linnaeus), 1758
 Psyllopsis fraxinicola (Förster, 1848)
 Psyllopsis machinosus Loginova, 1963
 Psyllopsis meliphila Löw, 1881
 Psyllopsis mexicana Crawford, 1914
 Psyllopsis narzykulovi Baeva, 1964
 Psyllopsis proprius Loginova, 1963
 Psyllopsis repens Loginova, 1963
 Psyllopsis securicola Loginova, 1963

References

Psyllidae
Psylloidea genera
Taxa named by Hermann Loew